The  Nebraska–Kearney Lopers football program represents the University of Nebraska at Kearney in college football and competes in the NCAA Division II. In 2012, Nebraska–Kearney became a member of the Mid-America Intercollegiate Athletics Association, and has remained in the league. UNK's home games are played at Ron & Carol Cope Stadium in Kearney, Nebraska.

History
Nebraska–Kearney's football program dates back to 1905 when the program went 0–5–1. Since their inaugural season the Lopers claim 32 conference championships.

Conference affiliations
 1916–1927 Nebraska College Athletic Conference
 1928–1942 Nebraska Intercollegiate Athletic Association
 1943–1975 Nebraska College Conference
 1976–1989 Central States Intercollegiate Conference
 1990–1995 NCAA Division II independent 
 1996–2011 Rocky Mountain Athletic Conference
 2012–present: Mid-America Intercollegiate Athletics Association

Stadium

The Lopers have played their home games at Ron & Carol Cope Stadium since 1939. The current capacity of the stadium is at 5,250.

All-time record vs. current MIAA teams
Official record (including any NCAA imposed vacates and forfeits) against all current MIAA opponents as of the end of the 2015 season:

References

External links
 

 
American football teams established in 1905
1905 establishments in Nebraska